Clifford Anthony Benson (born August 28, 1961) is a former American football tight end in the National Football League for the Atlanta Falcons, Washington Redskins, and the New Orleans Saints. He played for Alan B. Shepard High School in Palos Heights, Illinois. He played college football at Purdue University and was drafted in the fifth round of the 1984 NFL Draft.

References

External links
 Pro-Football-Reference.com

1961 births
Living people
American football tight ends
Atlanta Falcons players
Washington Redskins players
New Orleans Saints players
Players of American football from Chicago
Purdue Boilermakers football players